The Nash Ambassador is a luxury automobile that was produced by Nash Motors from 1927 until 1957. For the first five years it was a top trim level, then from 1932 on a standalone model. Ambassadors were lavishly equipped and beautifully constructed, earning them the nickname “the Kenosha Duesenberg".

But for a period between 1929 and 1934 when Nash produced a line of seven-passenger saloons and limousines, the Ambassador series was the maker's "flagship", and remained so following the Nash-Hudson merger in 1954. From 1958 until 1965, the cars were named Rambler Ambassador and then from the 1966 through 1974 model years as the AMC Ambassador. The continued use the Ambassador model name made it "one of the longest-lived automobile nameplates in automotive history."

1927-early 1932 

Nash Motors' first use of the name Ambassador was during the 1927 model year when a specially trimmed four-door, five-passenger club sedan version of the "Nash Advanced Six" (designated model 267) was developed. As the most expensive car in the line, the Ambassador received premium upgrades in upholstery and other trim items for a base price of US$2,090 (FOB) (US$ in  dollars ).

Exports accounted for almost 11% percent of Nash production in 1927, and the cars were purchased by several royal families. For example, Prince Wilhelm, Duke of Södermanland of Sweden and Norway personally visited the Nash factory in Kenosha, Wisconsin, in 1927, and Scandinavian factory workers delivered his Nash Ambassador Six (Model 267) four-door Brougham sedan.

The Ambassador model lost its position as Nash's most expensive car in 1929 with the introduction of seven-passenger sedan and limousine models that were carried through the 1934 model year.

The Ambassador remained in the Advanced Six range until 1930 when the model was moved to the "Nash Twin Ignition Eight" series. In 1931 the cumbersome Twin Ignition Eight name was replaced by the simpler "Eight-90" model designation.

Grand luxury cars during the 1930s included Packard, Lincoln, Duesenberg as well as those made by Nash. These were "luxuriously trimmed, beautifully designed and built bodies, custom-built to individual order, finished off the model that historian David Brownell famously dubbed 'Kenosha’s Duesenberg.'" The Classic Car Club of America (CCCA) recognizes all Nash 1930 Series 490, 1931 Series 890, and 1932 Series 990 as "Approved Classics."

Mid-1932-1934 

In mid-1932, Nash established the "Ambassador Eight" as a stand-alone model range, offered in a number of body styles, including coupes and victorias. All the cars were sumptuously appointed earning the title of the "Kenosha Duesenbergs" for their quality, durability, styling, and speed.

This was part of Nash's second 1932 series, which included completely new bodies and engineering updates to all models produced by the company. Sales of all automobiles were dismal during the Great Depression in the United States, yet Nash prospered and was the only company other than General Motors to make a profit in 1932.

The 1933 Nash models remained largely unchanged after the major styling and engineering transformations of early 1932 and were still described as "really a thing of beauty."

For 1934, Nash introduced an entirely new styling theme called "Speedstream" that featured generous use of ornamental moldings in body panels and fenders in a very streamlined and Art Deco way. The designs were influenced by Russian Count Alexis de Sakhnoffsky and the new bodies featured streamline accents, bullet-shaped headlights, horizontal hood ribs, rear-wheel spats, and built-in luggage boots with a full beaver-tail rear end. The Ambassador Eight series for this year was limited to various four-door sedan body styles.

The Nash Ambassador 8 now saw new competition with such cars as the redesigned and lower priced LaSalle, Auburn V-12, REO-Royale 8, Buick Series 34-90, and the Chrysler Imperial Airflow.

The CCCA has recognized all 1932 Series Advanced 8 and Ambassador 8, as well as the 1933 and 1934 Nash Ambassador 8 as "Approved Classics."

1935-1942 
The 1935 model year saw yet another complete re-styling known as "Aeroform" with a further trimming of body styles. A new two-door sedan was added to the Ambassador Eight series. However, the 1935 Ambassador Eight was now built on a shorter  wheelbase, and used the smaller, former Advanced Eight engine. Nash discontinued manufacturing and marketing the big models of the 1930-1934 era.

While the Ambassador had been offered only with Nash's in-line eight from mid-1932 through 1935. The 1936 Ambassador Six added Nash's largest in-line six as well, in a  wheelbase model, formerly known as the Advanced Six. In 1937 Nash acquired the Kelvinator Corporation as part of a deal that allowed Charlie Nash's handpicked successor, George W. Mason, to become President of the new Nash-Kelvinator Corporation. The 1937 models saw the return of coupes and convertibles to the Ambassador lines. From 1936 onward, the senior Nash models used identical bodies, relying on a longer wheelbase as well as the hood and front fenders (plus subtle trim augmentations) to provide visual cues to differentiate the more expensive Eights from the less expensive Six models.

Beginning in 1937, even the low-priced LaFayette series came under this plan. This basic formula was used through the final AMC Ambassador in 1974, with the exception of 1962 to 1964, when the Rambler Ambassador and the Rambler Classic shared the same wheelbase and front sheet metal. In 1937, Sinclair Oil Corporation teamed up with Babe Ruth in a baseball contest where a 1937 Nash Ambassador Eight sedan was awarded every week.

A custom-designed and specialty-built convertible model was marketed for 1940, the Sakhnoffsky Special Cabriolet.

For the 1941 and 1942 model years only all Nash vehicles became Ambassadors and rode both long and short wheelbases. The Ambassador Eight now shared the Ambassador Six's . The Nash Ambassador 600, built on a  wheelbase, became the first popular domestic automobile to be built using the single-welded "unibody" type of monocoque construction that Nash called "Unitized", rather than body-on-frame. From 1941 through 1948, Nash Ambassador models placed this unibody structure on top of a conventional frame, thus creating a solid and sturdy automobile. It was also one of the first cars in the "low-priced" market segment with coil spring suspension in front and back, giving it "the Arrow-Flight ride" along with other benefits.

In the spirit of wartime conservation, the Ambassador Six and Eight lost their twin ignition feature for 1942, reverting to a single spark plug per cylinder. The 1941-42 Ambassador 600 was also the only Ambassador ever powered by an L-head engine. Nash would remain with this model arrangement through the post-war 1946-1948 model years, although the 600 would no longer be known as an Ambassador.

Civilian car and truck production was curtailed during World War II (1942-1945) and companies turned to production that became part of the "arsenal of democracy."

1946-1948 
When production was resumed after the war, the Eights were no longer part of the program. The 1946 Ambassador Six was now the top of the Nash line.

In 1946 Nash introduced a wood-paneled version of the Ambassador called the "Suburban". Featuring high-quality ash framing, with mahogany paneling supplied by Mitchell-Bentley of Owosso, Michigan, the Suburban coachwork was based on the handsome “slipstream” sedan, a classic 1940s streamlined design. Intended as a halo car, the Suburban, like all other Nashes, featured options such as “Cruising Gear” overdrive, a trend-setting “Weather-Eye” heater, and a remote control Zenith radio, which enabled the driver to change stations at the touch of their toe. Production was limited, with Nash selling exactly 1,000 examples between 1946 and 1948.

A convertible was added to the Ambassador range for 1948, and an even 1,000 of this one-year-only body style was produced. The automaker allocated only one convertible to its major dealerships. The change to a new unibody design for the 1949 model year meant the end of the convertible body style until the compact-sized 1950 Nash Rambler.

1949-1951 

 
Nash-Kelvinator president George Mason believed in fiscal responsibility, but also wanted to be "a bit daring, bold, and out of the mainstream" by making "cars noticeably different from those of the mainline Big Three producers." Nash's Vice President of Engineering, Nils Eric Wahlberg, had access to a wind tunnel during the war and believed that future cars should take advantage of aerodynamics to achieve many benefits. Mason was also a convert to build a large aerodynamically clean family car for the postwar market and even championed the design's enclosed wheels as a bold innovative feature. The resulting car reflected aerodynamic notions of its era, with a rear half resembling the 1935 Stout Scarab.

Nash continued to use the Ambassador name on its top models 1949. The separate frame chassis of the 1941-1948 Ambassador was discontinued in favor of unibody construction for the 1949 models, a design the company introduced to the mass-market in 1941 with the 600 series cars. The Ambassador series continued to have a  wheelbase and the automaker claimed the new chassis design included 8,000 welds making its "1 1/2 to 2 1/2 times as rigid as conventional cars."

After Nash rolled out its Airflyte body style, Ambassador sales enjoyed a significant gain by selling just four- and two-door sedans in the 1949-1951 marketplace. They were manufactured at the Nash Factory (Kenosha, WI), and the Nash Factory (El Segundo, CA).

The Airflytes also featured fully reclining seats that could turn the car into a vehicle capable of sleeping three adults. The 1950 Ambassador became the first non-General Motors automobiles to be equipped with GM's Hydramatic automatic transmissions (cars with the automatic transmission have Selecto-lift starting, where the driver pulled the transmission lever on the column toward themselves to engage the starter). 1949 was the first year for a one-piece curved windshield, and front door wing windows featured curved glas2 as well.

Mason also believed that once the seller's market following World War II ended, that Nash's best hope for survival lay in a product range not addressed by other automakers in the United States at that time – the compact car. With sales of the large Nashes surging ahead of prewar production numbers, Mason began a small car program that would eventually emerge as the compact Nash Rambler reviving the traditional Rambler marque.

1952-1957

1952
The Nash Ambassador received a complete restyle for 1952 and celebrated the company's 50th anniversary as the predecessor firm, the Thomas B. Jeffery Company, marketed its first cars in 1902.

The Golden Anniversary Nash Airflyte featured styling that was publicly credited to Pinin Farina, yet the design was actually a combination of the Italian coachbuilder with ideas from Edmund E. Anderson, the lead designer at Nash. The new cars had more conventional lines than the previous 1949 through 1951 Ambassadors and they received several design awards. The large "envelope-bodied" sedans followed the pattern of Nash's enclosed wheels along with now larger die cast "toothy" grille bars. Several European touches were incorporated into production such as the reverse-slanted C-pillars and an interior fishnet "parcel holder" mounted above the windshield for keeping maps and sunglasses. Nash claimed that the Ambassador comfort and luxury features were so advanced "that other new cars seem outdated in comparison" and advertised the Ambassadors as having the widest and most comfortable seating. The 1952 unit-body design "were good-looking notchbacks" that "looked like nothing on the road" and the cars continued into 1954 almost unchanged. The 1955 models received a revised front grille with integral headlamps. The rear end was redesigned with more pronounced tailfins for 1956 while the final year saw a new front end with "quad" headlamps or two stacked headlamps per side.

1952
The 1952 Ambassador was available in "Super" and "Custom" series as a two- or four-door sedan and a two-door "Country Club" hardtop. The Super included Nash's basic features with the Custom adding two-tone upholstery with foam topped seat cushions designed by Helene Rother, electric clock, directional signals, chrome wheel discs, and automatic interior courtesy lights. Standard was the "Super Jetfire"   I6 engine and was available with optional dual-range Hydramatic automatic transmission or a Warner Gear overdrive unit.

Due to materials restrictions caused by the Korean War, Nash sales, like those of many other carmakers, dropped off sharply in 1952.

1953
The Ambassador received minor changes, such as small chrome spacers on the cowl air scoop. Ambassadors were available with dual carburetors and a high-compression aluminum head produceding  as the "Le Mans" option as from the Nash-Healey.

With the end of the Korean War, a battle for market leadership began between two historic rival automakers, Ford and Chevrolet. There was also a shift from a seller's to a buyer's market making it more difficult for the smaller U.S. automakers to compete with the Big Three (Ford, GM and Chrysler). The Big Three could afford annual styling changes to enhance their sales appeal.

1954

In 1954 the Nash Ambassador was the first American automobile to have a front-end, fully integrated heating, ventilating, and air-conditioning system. The heating and ventilation system was called Weather Eye and now could be equipped with Nash-Kelvinators' advanced Automobile air conditioning unit. While other manufacturers in America at the time offered A/C on some models, their air conditioning units were driven by a large and heavy, trunk mounted expander and heat exchanger that carried the air into the car via clear plastic tubes and out through ceiling mounted vents. Nash's unit was inexpensive, compact, fit under the hood, and could either circulate fresh or recycled air. With a single thermostatic control, the Nash passenger compartment air cooling option was described as "a good and remarkably inexpensive" system. The option was priced well below systems offered by other carmakers (in 1955, Nash offered it at US$345, against $550 for Oldsmobile or $570 for Chrysler); other makers, such as Ford, did not even offer optional air conditioning. (At the time, even a heater was not always standard equipment.)

The Ambassador continued with only a few changes. A new "floating" grille concave grille and partially chromed headlamp bezels were added to the front end. A redesigned instrument panel was a major change inside. The base trim was called "Super" while the higher "Custom" models featured a continental spare tire carrier and many other upgrades were available in four-door sedan and two-door "Country Club" hardtop forms.

A sales war developed between Ford and General Motors during 1953 and 1954 with the result leaving little business for the other domestic automakers. Ford and Chevrolet were shipping their standard size models to their respective dealers no matter if there were any orders for them. A price war with deep discounts to sell these cars meant a sales decline for the independent carmakers (Hudson, Kaiser, Nash, Packard, and Studebaker).

Nash-Kelvinator merged with ailing Hudson Motor Car Company as of January 14, 1954, to form American Motors Corporation (AMC), and both Nash and Hudson dealers sold the compact-sized Ramblers that were identical save for the "Nash" or "Hudson" badging. Although the "senior" Nash and Hudson models continued to be marketed, it was sales of the Rambler that were powering the company's bottom line. As the compact Rambler's fortunes increased, sales of the senior Nash cars, including the Ambassador, decreased. A total of 21,428 Ambassadors were built in 1954.

1955

Airflyte styling entered its final season with the heavily facelifted 1955 versions, created under the direction of Edmund E. Anderson. "Scenaramic" wrap-around windshields accompanied an entirely new front-end treatment with a new oval grille incorporating the headlights. The front fenders featured raised front wheel arches that showed more of the front wheel and tire than Nash had revealed since the 1949 models debuted. Ambassadors were now available with a V8 engine for the first time. The engine was supplied by Packard as part of George W. Mason's vision to have Packard join AMC to help achieve the economies of scale of the domestic Big Three automakers. The  V8 produced  and mated to Packard's Ultramatic automatic transmission.

1956

Ambassador models fielded for 1956 were heavily re-styled in the rear with big "lollipop" taillights and the cars were offered in a variety of two-and three-tone color schemes. The Ambassador line up was reduced to Super sedans with I6 engines as well as V8 powered Super and Custom sedans and the hardtop Custom Country Club. The Packard V8 was available through April 1956 after which AMC installed its own  V8 engine producing  and the cars were now called "Ambassador Special".

1957

The 1957 models were the first cars to come equipped with "quad" headlights as standard equipment. They were vertically stacked in the front fender "pontoons". The 1957 models featured enlarged front wheel well openings, to almost "normal" size. The wheels were now 14-inch with standard 8.00 x 14 tires.

The standard engine for the 1957 Ambassador was AMC's own V8, a modern overhead valve design displacing . It featured a forged steel crankshaft, a 4-barrel carburetor, and dual exhausts. Available were a 3-speed manual transmission, an automatic overdrive unit, or Packard's Ultramatic automatic transmission. The Custom models standard features included power brakes, individually adjustable reclining front seats, rear seat center armrest, hood ornament, and many more. Special leather seating surfaces were optional as well as a continental tire kit.

After production of under 3,600 big Nash cars, the final Nash Ambassador rolled off the Kenosha, Wisconsin production line in the summer of 1957. Nevertheless, the Ambassador - as a top-of-the-line model name - would continue to be marketed, under Rambler and AMC brands, through 1974.

Racing

Endurance 
Eight Nash Ambassadors were entered in the 1950 Carrera Panamericana, a  endurance race run over five days across Mexico. 47 of the 126 cars that started this "contest of heroic proportions and vast distances" were classified as finishers. Three Ambassadors finished all nine stages, but the highest-placed car was disqualified.

The 1950 Ambassador driven by Roy Pat Conner was in sixth place after the eighth stage, 33 minutes behind the leader, when Connor became too ill to continue. Curtis Turner, who shared another 1950 Ambassador with Bill France, Sr., purchased Conner's car for its superior race position, replacing Conner at the wheel and leaving France to continue in their original car without him. On the final stage Piero Taruffi, arguably the most experienced road racer in the field, had moved his Alfa Romeo 6C up to the fourth position when Turner passed him in the mountains by bumping the Italian "Southern-style" until he yielded. Taruffi repassed the Nash when it was temporarily halted by a flat tire. At the finish, Taruffi was in Turner's sights but Turner ended ahead in elapsed time, beating Taruffi by 3.5 minutes. This put Turner in third place overall, behind a Cadillac 62. He was disqualified when a quick review by the race officials showed that the rules specifically prohibited changing a car's crew.

Bill France eventually crashed out of the race but the damaged car was driven back to the United States, where France and Turner used it for a full season's dirt track racing in the Southern states. Mexican driver S. Santoyo was classified 36th in his 1949 Nash, while another 1949 Ambassador driven by Manuel Luz Meneses and José O'Farrill Larranoga finished 39th. In all, four Nashes crashed out, while a fifth retired with engine trouble.

NASCAR 
The Nash Motor Company was the first manufacturer that actively supported NASCAR racing. Direct factory sponsorship was provided for the 1950 and 1951 Sprint Cup seasons. For 1950, Nash recruited and signed dynamic stars Curtis Turner and Johnny Mantz.

 North Wilkesboro Speedway on September 24, 1950, Ebenezer "Slick" Smith drove a Nash Ambassador, but crashed midway through the race and finished 20th in the field of 26. This was the same car that Bill France had crashed in the Carrera Panamericana.
 Carrell Speedway (Gardena, California) on April 8, 1951, Johnny Mantz's Nash Ambassador finished the 200-lap race in second place. However, Ebenezer "Slick" Smith was actually driving the car at the checkered flag in relief for Mantz.

For the 1951 NASCAR season, other automakers became more involved in sponsorship.

 Daytona Beach Road Course on February 11 - Bill Holland driving a Nash Ambassador encountered mechanical trouble early in the season-opening event to finish 47th from the 54-cars that started the NASCAR Grand National race.
 Charlotte Speedway on April 1 - Curtis Turner won the 150-lap NASCAR Grand National race with his Nash Ambassador. This was the only first-place finish for the large-sized Nash Ambassador in the NASCAR Grand National series. The car driven to victory in the 400-lap NASCAR Short Track Grand National race in Lanham, Maryland by Tony Bonadies on July 14, 1951, was the new compact-sized Nash Rambler.
 Michigan State Fairgrounds Speedway on August 12 - The 1951 Nash Ambassador, was the Official Pace Car of the "Motor City 250" stock car race, and was driven by NASCAR's president, Bill France. Tim Flock won the race in a Hudson, earned $7,001 in cash, as well as a new Nash Ambassador.

See also 
 AMC Ambassador
 AMC Matador

Notes

References

External links 

 Nash Car Club
 Nash Healy History
 Nash in the UK
 

Ambassador
Ambassador
Flagship vehicles
Convertibles
Coupés
Sedans
Full-size vehicles
Streamline Moderne cars
Cars introduced in 1927
1930s cars
1940s cars
1950s cars
Pininfarina
Rear-wheel-drive vehicles
Motor vehicles manufactured in the United States